Korea Passing (코리아 패싱) is a neologism for the phenomenon of the Republic of Korea being alienated from the international community in the course of discussions on North Korea in 2017.

The origin and using of Korea Passing 
In 2017 discussion for presidential candidate, Yoo Seung-min, the Bareun Party candidate, mentioned the 'Korea passing'. Yoo argued Korea is isolated at diplomatic relation between global society. The term derives from Bill Clinton visiting only China without visiting Japan in 1998, which the Japanese media called the 'Japan passing', signifying "Japan's alienation from the global society." In early 2017, 'Korea passing' emerged as a diplomatic keyword in relation to the situation facing South Korea.

Criticism 
Originally, 'passing' is Japlish, and the correct English expression is a 'cold-shoulder'. Also, some point out that it is more of a 'Konglish' that each country's government will not use. However, major U.S. media outlets, including the Wall Street Journal, The Washington Post and Fox News, mentioned Korea passing as a new term related to the situation in South Korea.

Controversy

United States

South Korea-U.S. Friction on North Korea and THAAD 
Park Geun-hye was impeached in March 2017, and there was a high probability that Moon Jae-in, who is more friendly to North Korea, would win the upcoming election. The Trump administration was concerned that the incoming South Korean government would be passive in imposing strong sanctions on North Korea.

Tensions on the Korean Peninsula escalated when North Korea conducted its sixth nuclear test in September 2017 after firing several ballistic missiles in April 2017. In response, the Trump administration has stepped up sanctions and pressure on North Korea. Moon Jae-in administration, who took office at the same time,  ensured the safety of the North Korean regime.

Also, the administration formulated a policy that resume Kaesong Industrial Complex and Mount Kumgang tour for consolidating an economic cooperation with North Korea. Therefore, conflicts between Korea and the United States have emerged in earnest in this regard.

Donald Trump got in touch with Shinzo Abe right after North Korea fired ballistic missile, but did not reach out to Moon Jae-in. In this point, controversy was flared up more about Korea passing.
On the one hand, Moon Jae-in posed a question about transparency in deployment of the THAAD in Korean territory. And the conflict over the THAAD deployment deepened as the U.S. Department of Defense refuted the question.

U.S. side reaction 
The New York Times stirred up the controversy by claiming that South Korea will be 'odd man out' due to differences in North Korea policy at the Korea-U.S. and Japan summit on September 21, 2017. Then Donald Trump visited South Korea on November 7, and conducted a press conference with Moon Jae-in. Donald Trump made a comment "Korea is very important countries,", "there will be no exclude," and denied the 'Korea passing'. However, conservative opposition parties insisted Trump's comment is typical diplomatic rhetoric, and the controversy about 'Korea passing' will continue because there was no agreement.

Right after the US-South Korea summit, Donald Trump appreciated Moon Jae-in's cooperation to resolute North Korea problem and spoke there were several progress. But, the Wall Street Journal pointed out Moon jae-in's policy of Kaesong Industrial Complex, THAAD problem with China and they said, Moon Jae-in is 'unreliable friend' It was suggesting that US society was still negatively they rated the Moon Jae-in administration.

Controversy between South Korea and the U.S. during the North Korea-U.S. summit. 
On May 19, 2018, Donald Trump called to Moon Jae-in when right before Moon Jae-in visited US and asked why there is difference Moon Jae-in's pledge and North Korea's stance about denuclearization. And, Donald Trump has expressed discomfort.

Trump also kept a stiff look on his face during the May 22 summit between South Korea and the U.S. In addition, Trump unilaterally had most press conference peremptorily and scaled back existing an exclusive interview. Trump was questioned a total of 28 questions, Moon Jae-in had only two opportunity to reply.

Trump refused the interpreter to Moon Jae-in's last reply unilaterally, he said " I'm sure that's what I've heard before, so I don't have to listen to an interpreter.".

On May 24, Trump announced the cancellation of the 2018 North Korea-U.S. Summit, which was scheduled for June, without notice to the Republic of Korea.  
Blue House belatedly received the news of the cancellation through Twitter.

Related to this, controversy over 'Korea passing' has resurfaced. Hong Jun-pyo, who was delegatee of Liberty Korea Party, made mention of 'Korea passing', and contended Moon Jae-in administration is excluded from North Korea-U.S. summit negotiation. Then, he added the success of negotiation is up to U.S. and China.

On June 30, 2019, when 2019 Koreas–United States DMZ Summit was held, Trump didn't want Moon to join him according to John Bolton's book.

China 
China To abandon the debate of the Republic of Korea after the inauguration of the Moon Jae-in administration also flared up.

Conflict between South Korea and China over the THAAD deployment 
Moon Jae-in Sade to determine the additional deployment is president, Chinese Foreign Minister Wang Yi 'This decision is sprinkled with cold water on relations between the two countries.' protest. In addition, China, Xi Jinping said 'Moon Jae-in deceived us.' and sad as he complained. On October 31, 2017, South Korea and China released a joint document containing 'results of consultation between the two countries on improving relations' to normalize their relations. In the process, China touted that South Korea promised not to do three things: deploy additional THAAD, participate in the U.S. missile defense system, and cooperate with South Korea, the U.S., and Japan. This led to a controversy over Korea's diplomatic humiliation. China did not express its regret over the THAAD retaliation or prevent a recurrence, and stressed that exchanges between South Korea and China can be normalized as soon as possible by keeping the "Not-doing 3 Things" promise, leaving the possibility that the issue could spark in the future.

North Korea
North Korean policy changed after the launch of the government's Moon Jae-in. The South Korean government has continually proposed military talks, Red Cross talks and requests for the North to participate in the 2018 PyeongChang Winter Olympics, but North Korea has been unresponsive for some time, causing controversy.

But North Korea's participation in the 2018 Winter Olympics has been sputtering after its top leader Kim Jong-un signaled his intention to participate in the 2018 Winter Olympics in his New Year's message for 2018. Since then, there has been a flurry of inter-Korean relations, even after the successful inter-Korean summit in April 2018, but the dispute over the Korea Passing has flared up again due to conflicts over denuclearization and the North's unilateral disregard for the South Korean side.

North Korea unilaterally called off scheduled high-level talks between South Korea and the United States, denouncing the joint South Korea-U.S. exercise "Max Thunder" in a strong tone and condemning the defection of Thae Yong-ho, a former British construction worker in North Korea's state, as "human scum."

In June 2020, North Korea blew up an inter-Korean joint liaison office.

Japan 
In Japan, it has been recognized that ignore politely is the best way to deal with Moon Jae-in's administration.
And in defense white paper, Defense of japan 2019, Japan gave South Korea cold shoulder as security partner by lowering South Korea's standing.
Since 2018, the legal foundation of the friendly and cooperative relationship between two countries had overthrown. The legal foundation is "Agreement on the Settlement of Problems concerning Property and Claims and on Economic Co-operation between Japan and the Republic of Korea". Under this severe situation surrounding the relationship caused by the South Korea side, the government of Japan is waiting for South Korea to resolve this internationally illegal situation.

On the South Korea side, controversy erupted over Korea Passing when it was failed to arrange a summit meeting with Japan during the period of 2019 G20 Osaka summit. 
A former Korean minister of foreign affairs, Gong Ro-myung, criticized the Korean government for acting like amateurs, leading Korea-Japan relations to deteriorate catastrophically and hit rock bottom politically and economically.

See also 
Foreign relations of South Korea
THAAD
Moon Jae-in
Donald Trump
North Korea-United States summit (disambiguation)
2017 North Korean nuclear test
Globalization

References

2017 neologisms
International relations
North Korea–South Korea relations